Iraklis Ampelokipi F.C. is a Greek football club, based in Ampelokipoi, Thessaloniki and it was founded in 1980.

Honours

Domestic

 Fourth Division: 1
 2012-13
 Macedonia FCA Championship: 1
 2011-12

External links
http://iraklis-ampelokipon.weebly.com
https://www.gazzetta.gr/football/g-ethniki/article/1523301/iraklis-apektise-neo-sima-pic

Sport in Thessaloniki
Football clubs in Central Macedonia
Association football clubs established in 1980
1980 establishments in Greece
Gamma Ethniki clubs